Lithuania competed at the 2020 Summer Olympics in Tokyo. Originally scheduled to take place from 24 July to 9 August 2020, the Games were postponed to 23 July to 8 August 2021, because of the COVID-19 pandemic. It was the nation's eighth consecutive appearance at the Games in the post-Soviet era and tenth overall in Summer Olympic history.

After winning four medals in 2016, Lithuania's medal haul fell to a single silver medal in Tokyo, marking its weakest performance since 1996.

Medalists

Competitors
The following is the list of number of competitors in the Games.

Athletics

Lithuanian athletes achieved the entry standards, either by qualifying time or by world ranking, in the following track and field events (up to a maximum of 3 athletes in each event):

Track & road events

Field events

Canoeing

Sprint
Lithuania qualified a single boat (men's K-1 200 m) for the Games by winning the gold medal and booking an outright berth at the 2021 ICF Canoe Sprint World Cup 2 in Barnaul, Russia.

Qualification Legend: FA = Qualify to final (medal); FB = Qualify to final B (non-medal)

Cycling

Road
Lithuania entered one rider each to compete in both men's and women's Olympic road race, by virtue of his top 50 national finish (for men) and her top 100 individual finish (for women), respectively, in the UCI World Ranking.

Track
Following the completion of the 2020 UCI Track Cycling World Championships, Lithuanian riders accumulated spots in the women's team sprint, as well as the women's sprint and keirin, based on their country's results in the final UCI Olympic rankings.

Sprint

Team sprint

Qualification legend: FA=Gold medal final; FB=Bronze medal final

Keirin

Omnium

Gymnastics

Artistic
Lithuania entered one artistic gymnast into the Olympic competition. Rio 2016 Olympian Robert Tvorogal booked a spot in the men's individual all-around and apparatus events, by finishing sixth out of the twelve gymnasts eligible for qualification at the 2019 World Championships in Stuttgart, Germany.

Men

Judo
 
Lithuania entered one judoka into the Olympic tournament based on the International Judo Federation Olympics Individual Ranking.

Modern pentathlon
 
Lithuanian athletes qualified for the following spots in the modern pentathlon at the Games. London 2012 champion Laura Asadauskaitė secured an outright berth in the women's event by winning the gold medal at the 2019 UIPM World Cup Final in Tokyo, Japan. Justinas Kinderis and London 2012 Olympian Gintarė Venčkauskaitė confirmed places in their respective events, with the former finishing sixth and the latter fifth among those eligible for Olympic qualification at the 2019 European Championships in Bath, England.

Rowing

Lithuania qualified a total of four boats (three men's and one women's) for each of the following rowing events, three of them were gained at the 2019 FISA World Championships in Ottensheim, Austria, and the men's quadruple crew qualified through a final qualification regatta in Lucerne, Switzerland due to Russian crew declining their spot.

Qualification Legend: FA=Final A (medal); FB=Final B (non-medal); FC=Final C (non-medal); FD=Final D (non-medal); FE=Final E (non-medal); FF=Final F (non-medal); SA/B=Semifinals A/B; SC/D=Semifinals C/D; SE/F=Semifinals E/F; QF=Quarterfinals; R=Repechage

Sailing

Lithuanian sailors qualified one boat in each of the following classes through the class-associated World Championships, and the continental regattas.

M = Medal race; EL = Eliminated – did not advance into the medal race

Shooting

Lithuanian shooters achieved quota places for the following events by virtue of their best finishes at the 2018 ISSF World Championships, the 2019 ISSF World Cup series, European Championships or Games, and European Qualifying Tournament, as long as they obtained a minimum qualifying score (MQS) by 5 June 2021.

Swimming 

Lithuanian swimmers further achieved qualifying standards in the following events (up to a maximum of 2 swimmers in each event at the Olympic Qualifying Time (OQT), and potentially 1 at the Olympic Selection Time (OST)):

Weightlifting

Lithuania entered one male weightlifter into the Olympic competition. Arnas Šidiškis accepted a spare berth unused by Europe as the next highest-ranked weightlifter vying for qualification in the men's 109 kg category based on the IWF Absolute World Rankings.

Wrestling

Lithuania qualified one wrestler for the men's Greco-Roman 130 kg into the Olympic competition, by progressing to the top two finals at the 2021 European Qualification Tournament in Budapest, Hungary.

Greco-Roman

References

External links 

Nations at the 2020 Summer Olympics
2020
2021 in Lithuanian sport